Çetinkaya station is a railway station in Çetinkaya, Turkey. The station is located just west of the Çetinkaya junction, where the Çetinkaya-Malatya railway diverges from the Ankara-Kars railway.

Çetinkaya station was opened in 1936 by the Turkish State Railways.

The station consists of one side platform and two island platforms servicing three tracks, with a small freight yard of six tracks adjacent to it. TCDD Taşımacılık operates three daily intercity trains from Ankara (temporarily Irmak) to Kars, Kurtalan, and Tatvan, as well as a thrice daily regional train from Sivas to Divriği.

References

External links
Çetinkaya station timetable

Railway stations in Sivas Province
Railway stations opened in 2012
2012 establishments in Turkey
Kangal District
Railway stations opened in 1936